Pallavaram is a state assembly constituency in Tamil Nadu, India, that was formed after constituency delimitation in 2007. Its State Assembly Constituency number is 30. Located in Chengalpattu district, it is included in the Sriperumbudur parliamentary constituency for national elections. It is one of the 234 State Legislative Assembly Constituencies in Tamil Nadu in India.

It includes All Wards in Zone 1 and Zone 2, Wards comprising Hashinapuram and Nemilicherry villages in Zone 3 of Tambaram City Municipal Corporation, Ward 159 in Zone 12 of Greater Chennai Corporation (Meenambakkam) and Pozhichalur and Tirusulam Villages in St.Thomas Mount Panchayat Union.

Election results

2021

2016

2011

References

Assembly constituencies of Tamil Nadu
Kanchipuram district